Coteau, Coteaus, may refer to:

Places 
 Rural Municipality of Coteau No. 255, Saskatchewan, Canada
 Coteau Beach, Saskatchewan, Canada; a village and beach in the Rural Municipality of Coteau No. 255.
 Couteau Creek, a tributary of the South Saskatchewan River in Saskatchewan, Canada, containing the Coteau Creek Hydroelectric Station
 Coteau Road, New Brunswick, Canada
 Les Coteaux, Quebec, Canada; a municipality in Vaudreuil-Soulanges
 Coteau-Landing, Quebec, Canada; a former town subsequently merged into Les Coteaux
 Coteau-Station, Quebec, Canada; a former town subsequently merged into Les Coteaux
 Le Coteau, a commune in the Loire department in central France
 Canton of Le Coteau, a canton containing the commune, in Loire, France

Facilities and structures
 Coteau station, Les Coteaux, Quebec, Canada; a rail station
 Les Coteaux, Mulhouse, Alsace, France; a public housing estate
 Coteau Creek Hydroelectric Station, Saskatchewan, Canada

People 
 Michael Coteau (born 1972), Canadian politician
 David DeCoteau (born 1962), American-Canadian filmmaker

Other uses 
 Coteau Books, a small, non-profit literary press

See also

 Cote (disambiguation)
 Coteau-du-Lac canal, Quebec
 Coteaux (disambiguation)
 Couteau (disambiguation)
 Eau (disambiguation)
 Grand Coteau (disambiguation)